Haresfield Beacon is a  geological Site of Special Scientific Interest in Gloucestershire, notified in 1985. The site is listed in the ‘Stroud District’ Local Plan, adopted November 2005, Appendix 6 (online for download) as an SSSI and a Regionally Important Geological Site (RIGS).

Location and geology
The site was formerly called Haresfield Hill and is considered a classic site of significant importance for its Jurassic rocks. The site includes the Cotswold Cephalopod Bed of the Upper Lias, and the scissum Beds of the Inferior Oolite. Its most important significance is the rich fossil fauna exposed for research purposes and dating the succession.

References

SSSI Source
 Natural England SSSI information on the citation
 Natural England SSSI information on the Haresfield Beacon unit

External links
 Natural England (SSSI information)

Sites of Special Scientific Interest in Gloucestershire
Sites of Special Scientific Interest notified in 1985
Hills of Gloucestershire